Allegory of Painting is an artwork attributed in 1988 to the Italian baroque artist Artemisia Gentileschi, although more recent research has confirmed it was painted by a Neapolitan anonymous painter in mid-XVIIth century. It hangs in the Musee de Tesse, Le Mans, France.

Description
A nude woman lies on her side, apparently asleep, with her midsection partially covered by drapery. She is surrounded by the tools of an artists, such as a palette, drawing compass and brushes as well as the symbolic mask of imitation. Analysis of x-rays revealed another image under the left arm - a bishop wearing a mitre.

Provenance
It was first documented in the Popeliniere family, from whom it was acquired by the present owners in 1836.

Attribution
It could be one of multiple paintings done by Gentileschi with this theme, but the depiction in this particular painting is unusual, and scholars have debated the meaning and attribution. Bissell saw the depiction as too crude to be the work of Artemisia; he instead viewed it as an insult to the family of Orazio Gentileschi, her father, by the hand of his adversary Giovanni Baglione. Christiansen however supported the attribution to Artemisia, relating it to other works of hers from the same period.

References

Sources

Paintings by Artemisia Gentileschi
1620s paintings